M. gracilis may refer to:
 Machaeranthera gracilis, a flowering plant species
 Macroramphosus gracilis, the slender snipefish, a fish species
 Madia gracilis, the grassy tarweed and slender tarweed, a flowering plant species
 Maxillaria gracilis, the delicate maxillaria, an orchid species native to eastern and southern Brazil
 Melanotaenia gracilis, the slender rainbowfish, a fish species endemic to Australia
 Melanonus gracilis, the pelagic cod, a small deepwater fish species found in the Southern Ocean
 Meliphaga gracilis, the graceful honeyeater, a bird species
 Melomys gracilis, the black-tailed mosaic-tailed rat, a rodent species
 Micrathena gracilis, the spined micrathena, a spider species
 Microcephalophis gracilis, the graceful small-headed sea snake or slender sea snake, a snake species
 Microgale gracilis, the gracile shrew tenrec, a mammal species endemic to Madagascar
 Mylochromis gracilis, a fish species endemic to Malawi
 Myurella gracilis, Lindb., a sea snail species in the genus Myurella

See also
 Gracilis (disambiguation)